The Toyota Gazoo Racing World Rally Team is a competitor of the World Rally Championship (WRC) based in Finland, serving as the entry for the car manufacturer Toyota. Its team principal is former WRC driver Jari-Matti Latvala and its drivers for 2023 include reigning champion Kalle Rovanperä, alongside Elfyn Evans, Takamoto Katsuta and Sébastien Ogier. The team made its debut during the 2017 season, where it entered the Toyota Yaris WRC.

The team is a separate operational unit to the Toyota Gazoo Racing team that competes in the World Endurance Championship, but both are a part of Toyota Gazoo Racing Europe.

In 2018, the team won the championship for manufacturers, Toyota's first since 1999, followed by more wins in 2021 and 2022. The team have also delivered championship titles for drivers and co-drivers every year since 2019.

History

In January 2015, Toyota officially announced its intention to return to the World Rally Championship in 2017. The manufacturer had last competed in the series in 1999 before withdrawing ahead of the 2000 season to focus on its Formula One project. For the new project, development of the Yaris WRC was delegated to Toyota Motorsport GmbH (TMG), the division that ran Toyota Team Europe and the previous WRC campaigns in the 1980s and 1990s with Group B and Group A Celicas, and the Toyota Corolla World Rally Car.

In July 2015 however, Toyota President Akio Toyoda elected to reassign responsibility for the project to Tommi Mäkinen, who based the team in his native Finland. Only the engine would be built by TMG, and by this time new World Rally Car regulations due for 2017 forced Mäkinen to shelve the Yaris WRC prototype and start anew.

Also in 2015, Toyota consolidated all its motorsport activities to operate under the banner of Toyota Gazoo Racing, with TMG being renamed Toyota Gazoo Racing Europe.

2017

Toyota made their return to the WRC after eighteen years of absence in 2017 season with Toyota Yaris WRC. 

Following the withdrawal of Volkswagen Motorsport from the sport, Jari-Matti Latvala and co-driver Miikka Anttila joined Toyota Gazoo Racing, where they were team-mates with Juho Hänninen, who returned to the championship for the first time since 2014, and his co-driver Kaj Lindström. Reigning WRC2 champions Esapekka Lappi and Janne Ferm made their début in a WRC specification car, contesting a partial campaign from the Rally of Portugal.

The team took their first podium at the Monte Carlo Rally, and took their first win at the next round in Rally Sweden. The team's best result of the season came in Finland, with Lappi taking his first WRC win, Hänninen his first podium finish, although Latvala had to retire from the lead with a mechanical problem.

The team finished the season third in the manufacturers' championship.

2018
Ahead of the 2018 season, Ott Tänak and Martin Järveoja left M-Sport to join the team, replacing the crew of Hänninen and Lindström who took new positions within the team. Hänninen remained in a test driver role and Lindström replaced Jarmo Lehtinen as the team's sporting director.

In August, the team relocated its service base to a new facility in Estonia, located 8 km from the capital of Tallinn. Headquarters, development, testing and administration remained in Finland.

Toyota Gazoo Racing WRT won the 2018 World Rally Championship manufacturers title. With Tommi Mäkinen heading the team, he became the first person in the history of the championship to win both as a driver and as a team principal. Tänak took four rally wins, including three consecutively. Jari-Matti Latvala won once.

2019
In 2019, Esapekka Lappi and Janne Ferm left to join Citroën after two years with the team. Kris Meeke and Sebastian Marshall were recruited to drive a third car in the championship. Tänak and Järveoja won the driver's and co-driver's championships, although Toyota would finish runners-up to Hyundai in the manufacturers' championship.

2020

In the 2020 season, Toyota had a brand new line up with six-time WRC champion Sébastien Ogier joining from Citroën who had pulled out of the 2020 season with Elfyn Evans from M-Sport and Kalle Rovanperä from Škoda Motorsport all joining Toyota for this season, as 2019 champion Ott Tänak left to join Hyundai, and Kris Meeke left the team as well.

In September, Toyota Gazoo Racing completed the purchase of the team and operational assets from Tommi Mäkinen Racing. Mäkinen himself stepped down from the team principal role and became a motorsports advisor to the Toyota Motor Corporation.

2021
The facility in Estonia closed at the end of the 2021 season, with team operations being run from one base in Jyväskylä, Finland.

2022

2023

WRC results

Notes

References

External links

 
 Team profile at wrc.com

Toyota
World Rally Championship teams
Toyota in motorsport